Chandrakanth "Chandra" Arya  (born 1963) is an Indo-Canadian Liberal politician, who  represents the riding of Nepean in the House of Commons of Canada since the 2015 federal election.

Biography 
Arya is native of Dwarlu village, Sira Taluk, Tumakuru district, Karnataka state.  He did his M.B.A from Kousali Institute of Management Studies, Dharwad which is affiliated with Karnatak University, Dharwad. In 2006, Arya immigrated to Canada. He was the chairman of the Indo-Canada Ottawa Business Chamber prior to entering politics.

Political career 
Arya was elected to represent the riding of Nepean in the House of Commons of Canada in the 2015 federal election and subsequently re-elected in the 2019 federal election. He currently serves as a member of the Standing Committee on International Trade.

In 2016, political journalist Kady O'Malley reported that Arya faced an ethics inquiry after awarding 26 graduating elementary, middle school students high school student either an Amazon Kindle e-reader or  $500 in cash for showing "perseverance in the face of adversity".  Arya defended himself against accusations that he violated the House of Commons conflict of interest code by stating that the Nepean Liberal Riding Association paid for the award.

In 2021, Arya apologized after a staffer emailed private information of nine hundred constituents to CPC staffers. The CPC told their staffers to delete the email and Arya didn't face any sanctions due to Canadian privacy laws. He was reelected in the 2021 federal election despite criticism from the members of the Ottawa Punjabi Association, who put up anti-Arya signs during the campaign, Sean Devine, the NDP candidate as well as the Conservative Party (CPC) candidate over his performance representing the riding.

In 2022, Arya became the first member of parliament to speak in Kannada,his mother tongue, in the House of Commons of Canada. Arya blamed “Khalistani extremists” for vandalizing Hindu temples in Toronto. When filmmaker Leena Manimekalai faced backlash online for a poster of her movie Kaali, which depicted the Hindu goddess, Kali smoking and holding an LGBT flag, he condemned the poster on twitter. This prompted criticism from over a hundred academics, activists and community organization members, who send a letter to the prime minister of Canada, Justin Trudeau.

In November Arya's private member billl, which proclaimed that November is Hindu Heritage Month  passed unanimously. When Arya raised a flag on Parliament Hill to celebrate the event; academics from the Université du Québec à Montréal,  Hindus for Human Rights and the Canadian Council of Muslim Women sent letters to Trudeau due to their belief that it appeared that flag represented the Hindu nationalist organization, Rashtriya Swayamsevak Sangh. Arya told CBC News that the flag "represented the Hindu faith" and "not support for any political organization".

During the 2022 Ottawa Municipal Elections, he endorsed Mark Sutcliffe for mayor.

In 2023, Global News reported that from July 2020 to September 30, 2022, Arya outpaced his house colleges in "protocol" gifts by purchasing 1,025 plaques for a total worth of $21,931 by using taxpayer funds. Global noted that contracted to a single company SINIX Media Group, who received fifty-three contracts for a amount of $53,681.50 from Arya’s constituency office over the same period. He told the outlet that the plaques were for his constituents but ignored any questions about a working relationship with the firm's chief executive officer.

Electoral record

References 

Election Night Results – Electoral Districts

External links 

Living people
Liberal Party of Canada MPs
Members of the House of Commons of Canada from Ontario
Politicians from Ottawa
Canadian bankers
Canadian engineers
Canadian politicians of Indian descent
21st-century Canadian politicians
1963 births